The Virtuous Scoundrel (French: La Vie d'un honnête homme), is a 1953 French comedy drama film  directed and written by Sacha Guitry and starring Michel Simon, Marguerite Pierry and Laurence Badie. It was shot at Photosonor Studios in Paris and on location in the city. The film's sets were designed by the art director Aimé Bazin.

Synopsis
Two twin brothers have lived apart for many years. Albert has become a financial success and lives a very rigid life with his family while Alain is a free spirit enjoying a series of adventures travelling the world. After meeting Alain dies from a heart attack and on a spur of the moment Albert changes clothes with him and begins to enjoy his newfound freedom. However his wife, believing herself now to be a widow, attempts to marry who she thinks is Alain as he has inherited all of his brother's wealth.

Cast 
 Michel Simon as Albert and Alain Ménard-Lacoste
 Marguerite Pierry as Madeleine Lacoste, wife of Albert
 Laurence Badie as Juliette Lacoste, the daughter of Albert and Madeleine
 François Guérin as Pierre Lacoste, the son of Albert and Madeleine
 Louis de Funès as Emile, the valet of the Ménard-Lacoste
 Claude Gensac as Evelyne
 Léon Walther as Maître Denisot
 Michel Nastorg as 	Le mécanicien
 Marthe Salbel as Marie, cousin of Ménard-Lacoste
 Pauline Carton as the patroness of the hotel
 Lana Marconi as a prostitute, nicknamed "la comtesse"
 Georges Bever as the taxi driver
 André Brunot as the doctor Ogier
 Marcel Pérès as the commissary Vincent
 Max Dejean as the innkeeper
 Marcel Mouloudji as 	Le chanteur 
 Sacha Guitry as 	Self

References

Bibliography
 Crisp, Colin. French Cinema—A Critical Filmography: Volume 2, 1940–1958. Indiana University Press, 2015.

External links 
 
 La Vie d’un honnête homme (1953) at the Films de France

1953 films
French comedy-drama films
1953 comedy-drama films
1950s French-language films
French black-and-white films
Films directed by Sacha Guitry
Films set in Paris
Films shot in Paris
1950s French films